Cook River may refer to:

 Cook River / Weheka, on the south island of New Zealand
 Cook River (Jacques-Cartier River tributary), in Jacques-Cartier National Park, Quebec, Canada
 Cook River (Tobago), see List of rivers of Trinidad and Tobago

See also
 Cooks River, a tributary of Botany Bay, New South Wales, Australia